Boninthemis is a monotypic genus of dragonflies in the family Libellulidae containing the single species Boninthemis insularis. It is endemic to Japan.

References

Endemic fauna of Japan
Insects of Japan
Libellulidae
Monotypic Odonata genera
Insects described in 1913
Taxonomy articles created by Polbot
Taxa named by Shōnen Matsumura